Robin Pearson Rose is an American movie and television actress.

Selected filmography 
Film
 An Enemy of the People (1978) as Petra Stockmann
 Last Resort (1986) as Sheila Lollar
 Something's Gotta Give as nurse
 Annabelle (2014) as the Mother
Television
 The Adams Chronicles, chapter V (1976) as Polly Jefferson
 Lucy & Desi: Before the Laughter (1991) as Vivian Vance
 Grey's Anatomy (seasons 1, 2, 3, 5, 16) as Patricia Murphy

References

External links 
 
 
 Robin Pearson Rose - Geffen Playhouse

American film actresses
Year of birth missing (living people)
Living people
American television actresses
20th-century American actresses
21st-century American actresses